Daniël "Daan" de Neef (born 15 September 1977) is a Dutch speechwriter and former politician for the conservative liberal People's Party for Freedom and Democracy (VVD). De Neef was a political staffer of the VVD and owned a speech consultancy, and he held a seat in the Breda municipal council starting in 2018. He was elected to the House of Representatives in the 2021 general election. De Neef stepped down the following year, saying that the VVD was no longer his party.

Early life and career 
De Neef was born and raised in Rotterdam, living in its neighborhood Oosterflank. He attended the secondary school MAVO Kralingen and studied journalism at the Utrecht University of Applied Sciences. He also studied philosophy in 2010 for one year at Leiden University.

Starting in 2003, De Neef worked as a press secretary of the VVD's House caucus. He was the editor of the 2004 book Ode aan de vrijheid (Ode to freedom), which contains introductions to liberal philosophers by prominent VVD members including Jozias van Aartsen, Frits Bolkestein, Ayaan Hirsi Ali, and Geert Wilders, the latter of whom left the party around the time of the book's publication. Another book by De Neef was published in 2008 called Canon van de filosofie. It lists the 76 most important philosophical works based on the opinions of 24 professors, and it was an initiative of Filosofie Magazine. While working for the VVD's House caucus, De Neef occasionally wrote speeches for Prime Minister Mark Rutte.

He left his job to become a speechwriter at the Ministry of Social Affairs and Employment and later returned to the VVD, where he was responsible for the communication between Mark Rutte's office and the party's House caucus. De Neef founded and ran a speech and presentation consultancy called Epic Empire, and he simultaneously served as adjunct secretary for communication of the Raad voor Dierenaangelegenheden (Animal affairs council) starting in March 2020.

Politics

Breda municipal council 
He was the VVD's seventh candidate in Breda in the 2018 municipal elections and was elected to the council. De Neef's focus was on sustainability, nature, animal welfare, public space, and education. In the council, he proposed introducing a community service officer concerned solely with animal issues.

House of Representatives 
De Neef was placed 56th on the VVD's party list in the 2010 general election. He received 183 preference votes and was not elected, as his party won 31 seats.

He again ran for member of parliament in the 2021 general election as the VVD's 34th candidate. He was also part of the committee that wrote the party's election program. The VVD won exactly 34 seats, causing De Neef to get elected, and he personally received 928 votes. De Neef was sworn into the House of Representatives on 31 March and was the VVD's spokesperson for youth policy, the Youth Act, youth health care, civilian service, and sheltered housing (formerly also occupational safety and health, poverty, and credit counseling). He was on the Committees for Agriculture, Nature and Food Quality; for Health, Welfare and Sport; and for Social Affairs and Employment. De Neef announced on 31 August 2022 that he would leave the VVD after eighteen years and vacate his seat in the House of Representatives. In a statement, he said that he could no longer defend the party's lack of compassion when dealing with asylum seekers, referring to its response to capacity problems at the Dutch application center in Ter Apel. Besides, he was struggling with the VVD's position on animal welfare. De Neef was succeeded by Martijn Grevink on 6 September.

Personal life 
While a member of parliament, De Neef moved from Breda to The Hague, and he has before lived in Rotterdam and The Hague. He is vegan, and since 2020 he has been in a relationship with Leonie Gerritsen, a member of the Party for the Animals who is a municipal councilor in The Hague and who was her party's 23rd candidate in the 2021 general election. A fan of death, black, and doom metal, De Neef was the singer of heavy metal band Concedo Nulli. His favorite band is Amenra.

References 

1977 births
21st-century Dutch politicians
Dutch speechwriters
Living people
Members of the House of Representatives (Netherlands)
Municipal councillors of Breda
People's Party for Freedom and Democracy politicians
Political staffers
Political spokespersons